WBEV (1430 kHz) is an AM radio station  broadcasting a sports radio format. Licensed to Beaver Dam, Wisconsin, United States, the station is currently owned by Good Karma Brands.

History
WBEV originally signed on as a daytime-only station in 1951 and added nighttime service in December 1979. The station first ran a MOR format from the 1970s until 1984, and later adult contemporary for more than a decade beginning in 1984 and continued into the 1990s. Beginning in 1993, the station began adding news/talk programs into its lineup. Right when the 2000s rolled along, its music format was dropped and the station went into full-service brokered programming with news, talk, farm, and sports programs from ESPN Radio, as well as infomercial programming on both weekdays and weekends. In the 2010s, the station added an oldies music format to its brokered programming lineup.

On August 15, 2022, the station dropped its full-service brokered programming format and flipped to sports talk, retaining its ESPN Radio affiliation from its former full-service brokered programming lineup.

Notable DJs 
Notable people who worked for WBEV included Jack Horkheimer, the creator and host of Jack Horkheimer: Star Gazer; he began work at the station in 1953 at age 15.  

Other persons of interest that have worked at WBEV include “Uncle” Bill McCollum, who started working at the station on July 4, 1964.  Uncle Bill is the longtime host of the BarnShow, Dodge County’s premiere Polka radio show.  

On July 27, 2022, the station announced it would flip to sports as "ESPN 1430" on August 15 after a fifteen-day period of moving the station's programming to WXRO under the WBEV-FM call sign.

References

External links

BEV
Beaver Dam, Wisconsin
1951 establishments in Wisconsin
Radio stations established in 1951
Sports radio stations in the United States
ESPN Radio stations